Stemonosudis intermedia is a species of fish found in tropical and subtropical waters in the Atlantic Ocean from the US to southern Brazil.

Size

References 

Paralepididae
Taxa named by Vilhelm Ege
Fish described in 1933